The 32nd World Science Fiction Convention (Worldcon), also known as Discon II, was held on 29 August–2 September 1974 at the Sheraton Park Hotel in Washington, D.C., United States.

The official co-chairmen were Jay and Alice Haldeman; Ron Bounds was the vice-chairman.

Participants 

Attendance was 3,587.

Guests of Honor 

 Roger Zelazny (pro)
 Jay Kay Klein (fan)
 Andrew J. Offutt (toastmaster)

Awards

1974 Hugo Awards 

 Best Novel: Rendezvous with Rama by Arthur C. Clarke
 Best Novella: "The Girl Who Was Plugged In" by James Tiptree, Jr.
 Best Novelette: "The Deathbird" by Harlan Ellison
 Best Short Story: "The Ones Who Walk Away from Omelas" by Ursula K. Le Guin
 Best Dramatic Presentation: Sleeper
 Best Professional Editor: Ben Bova
 Best Professional Artist: Frank Kelly Freas
 Best Amateur Magazine (tie):
 Algol, edited by Andy Porter
 The Alien Critic, edited by Richard E. Geis
 Best Fan Writer: Susan Wood
 Best Fan Artist: Tim Kirk

Other awards 

 John W. Campbell Award for Best New Writer (tie):
 Spider Robinson
 Lisa Tuttle
 Gandalf Grand Master Award: J. R. R. Tolkien

See also 

 Hugo Award
 Science fiction
 Speculative fiction
 World Science Fiction Society
 Worldcon

References

External links 

 NESFA.org: The Long List
 NESFA.org: 1974 convention notes 

1974 conferences
1974 in Washington, D.C.
1974 in the United States
Science fiction conventions in the United States
Worldcon